SDHS may refer to:

 New Taipei Municipal ShiDing High School, a high school in New Taipei, Taiwan
 San Diego High School, a high school in San Diego, California, United States
 San Diego High School (Texas), a high school in San Diego, Texas, United States
 South Dade High School, a high school in Homestead, Florida, United States
 Stuarts Draft High School, a high school in Stuarts Draft, Virginia, United States
 Summit Denali High School, a high school run by charter school organization Summit Public Schools